Euseius zairensis is a species of mite in the family Phytoseiidae.

References

zairensis
Articles created by Qbugbot
Animals described in 2001